Knox City may mean:
 Knox City, Missouri
 Knox City, Texas
 The City of Knox in Victoria, Australia. (Also known as the Knox City Council)
 Westfield Knox, formerly known as Knox City Shopping Centre
 Knox City FC